Colleen Callahan Burns is an agribusiness news reporter and Director of the Illinois Department of Natural Resources.  She was the Democratic nominee for Illinois's 18th congressional district in 2008.

Family
Callahan grew up on a farm near Milford, Illinois and graduated as salutatorian from Milford Township High School in May 1969.

Her family has long been active in politics in downstate Illinois. Her father, Francis Callahan, was chair of the Iroquois County Democrats. Her grandfather, Joseph R. Callahan, was in the Illinois House of Representatives.  Her uncle, Gene Callahan, was the administrative assistant and press secretary for Lieutenant Governor Paul Simon (before Simon became a United States senator) and chief of staff for U.S. Senator Alan Dixon; his daughter, Cheri Bustos is the U.S. representative for the neighboring Illinois's 17th congressional district.

Callahan and her husband Dick Burns live on a farm near Kickapoo, Illinois, between Brimfield, Illinois and Peoria, where they raise purebred Angus cattle. They have a grown daughter who became a practicing attorney in Chicago.

Career
After graduating from the University of Illinois at Urbana-Champaign in 1973, she moved to Peoria to work for WMBD (AM) until 2005.  She was agribusiness reporter for WMBD-TV and WCIA from 1974 to 1997.

In 2003, she went on a study trip to Afghanistan and Iraq, paid for at her own expense, at the invitation of the U.S. Secretary of Agriculture. She started her own business, Colleen Callahan Communications, in 2003. At the beginning of 2003, she changed employers from WMBD in Peoria to WGFA in Watseka, Illinois; she has been agribusiness director at both stations.

In 2008, she ran for U.S. Representative for Illinois's 18th congressional district, a seat open by the retirement of Ray LaHood.  She won the Democratic nomination, but lost the November 4 general election to Republican Aaron Schock, 59% to 38%, with 3% going to Sheldon Schafer.

On 13 June 2009, Callahan began work as United States Department of Agriculture Illinois State Director of Rural Development.

In 2017, Colleen Callahan was named by J.B. Pritzker the co-chair of the latter's Agriculture Transition Committee.  Once Pritzker had become governor, Callahan became Director of the Illinois Department of Natural Resources on March 1, 2019.

Civic participation
Callahan has served on the boards of many local organizations, including:
 Peoria YWCA
 Nature Conservancy Great Rivers Regional Board
 Youth for a Cause
 The Children's Home in Peoria
 University of Illinois ACES Alumni Association (President)
 Morton Community Bank

She has also served as a member of the St. Francis Medical Center Women's Health Services Public Relations Committee, and is a member of the National Association of Women Business Owners. She has been heavily involved in the National Association of Farm Broadcasters (NAFB), was its first female president, and was chairman of the NAFB Ethics Committee.

She has also been active in local Catholic schools, serving on the education board at St. Mary's grade school in Kickapoo and assisting Peoria Notre Dame High School.

See also
 United States House of Representatives elections in Illinois, 2008
 Illinois's 18th congressional district

References

External links
 Colleen Callahan Consultancy — official website
  — official 2008 campaign website
 Colleen Callahan's blog from 2008 political campaign
 Colleen Callahan 08 on YouTube
 
 Campaign contributions at OpenSecrets.org
 

Year of birth missing (living people)
Living people
American motivational speakers
Women motivational speakers
American radio reporters and correspondents
American television reporters and correspondents
American women television journalists
Candidates in the 2008 United States elections
Catholics from Illinois
Farmers from Illinois
Illinois Democrats
Journalists from Illinois
Natural resources ministers
People from Milford, Illinois
People from Peoria County, Illinois
Radio personalities from Illinois
School board members in Illinois
United States Department of Agriculture officials
University of Illinois Urbana-Champaign alumni
Women in Illinois politics
American women radio journalists
21st-century American women